Carnarvon (Pant) was the temporary northern terminus of the Carnarvonshire Railway, located on the southern fringe of Caernarfon, Gwynedd, Wales.

The line from Afon Wen to Caernarfon was built from the country end, as were the other standard gauge routes to the town, resulting in there being three temporary termini on the edges of Caernarfon. This was eventually resolved by building the "Caernarfon Town Line" through a tunnel under the historic centre to join the various routes. When this was completed Pant station was closed.

The station appears to have been built on rented land, as in November 1868 a Mr Rice Thomas threatened to eject the railway from the station for non-payment of rent. The facilities included a platform and a turntable, both still traceable on the land in the 1940s and a siding which acted as an open air engine shed.

Freight and passenger trains passed through the edge of the station site until 7 December 1964, when all services were withdrawn. The line was lifted in 1969.

In 1997 the Welsh Highland Railway began running through the edge of the station site, having used part of the trackbed for their narrow gauge line to Porthmadog.

Sources cited in this article differ on the station's location, research continues.

References

Sources

   For 1997 edition see .

Further reading

External links
 The station site on a navigable OS Map National Library of Scotland
 The station and line Rail Map Online
 The line CNV with mileages Railway Codes
 The Nantlle Railway Jagger's Heritage
 The Nantlle Railway in Caernarfon Festipedia
 Pant station location Gwynedd Archaeological Trust, Page 2
 Location of Pant station Welsh Highland Heritage
 By DMU from Pwllheli to Amlwch Huntley Archives

Disused railway stations in Gwynedd
Railway stations in Great Britain opened in 1867
Railway stations in Great Britain closed in 1871
Former London and North Western Railway stations
Llanrug